Live at the Isle of Wight 1970, Live at the Isle of Wight Festival 1970, or Live at the Isle of Wight may refer to:
 Live at the Isle of Wight 1970 (Leonard Cohen album) (2009)
 Live at the Isle of Wight Festival 1970 (The Doors album) (2018)
 Live at the Isle of Wight Festival 1970 (Emerson, Lake & Palmer album) (1997)
 Live Isle of Wight '70, a 1991 album by Jimi Hendrix
 Blue Wild Angel: Live at the Isle of Wight, a 2002 album by Jimi Hendrix
 Nothing Is Easy: Live at the Isle of Wight 1970, a 2004 album by Jethro Tull
 Live at the Isle of Wight Festival 1970 (The Moody Blues album) (2008)
 Live at the Isle of Wight (Taste album) (1971)
 Live at the Isle of Wight Festival 1970 (The Who album) (1996)
 Live at the Isle of Wight Festival 1970 (film) (1998)

See also
Isle of Wight Festival 1970